Carol Doris Chomsky (July 1, 1930 – December 19, 2008) was an American linguist and education specialist who studied language acquisition in children.

Biography
Carol Doris Schatz was born in Philadelphia on July 1, 1930. She married Noam Chomsky in 1949, the two having known each other since she was five years old and he was seven. Her mother had been a teacher at a Hebrew school where his father was the principal. She was awarded a bachelor's degree in French from the University of Pennsylvania in 1951.

The couple spent time living in HaZore'a, a kibbutz in Israel. Although enjoying themselves, Noam Chomsky was appalled by the Jewish nationalism and anti-Arab racism that he encountered in the country, as well as the pro-Stalinist trend that he thought pervaded the kibbutz's leftist community. "It also was way before there were even words about women's rights" according to Judith Chomsky, wife of Noam Chomsky's younger brother. Despite Carol's interest in becoming a mechanic or driving a tractor at the time of the young couple's stay in 1953, they returned to the United States.

She earned a doctoral degree in linguistics from Harvard University in 1968, having attended the school in order to ensure that she would be able to make a living in the event that her husband would be sent to jail for his active opposition to the Vietnam War.

Chomsky's best-known book is The Acquisition of Syntax in Children From 5 to 10 (1969). The book investigated how children develop an understanding of the underlying grammatical structure of their native language, as well as how they use this skill to interpret sentences of increasing complexity as they get older. Despite earlier scientific beliefs that children complete their acquisition of syntax by the age of five, Chomsky's research showed that children continue to develop the skills needed to understand complex constructions beyond that age.

As part of her research to understand how children develop the ability to read, she developed a method in the late 1970s called repeated reading, in which children would read a text silently while a recording of the text was played. The child would repeat the process until the text could be read fluently without the tape. Research showed that four readings accompanied by a recording could be enough to provide added reading fluency for most children. More than 100 studies have been performed on the technique, with most finding statistically significant improvements in reading speed and word recognition.

She served on the faculty of the Harvard Graduate School of Education from 1972 until 1997.

Chomsky died of cancer on December 19, 2008, at her home in Lexington, Massachusetts. She was 78 years old.

Publications
 The acquisition of syntax in children from 5 to 10, 1968
 Imparare la sintassi : uno studio con bambini di scuola elementare, 1978
 M-ss-ng l-nks : young people's literature, 1982
 M-ss-ng l-nks : a game of letters and language, 1983
 M-ss-ng l-nks : classics old and new, 1983
 M-ss-ng l-nks : microencyclopedia, 1984

References

1930 births
2008 deaths
American educational theorists
American expatriates in Israel
Linguists from the United States
Deaths from cancer in Massachusetts
Harvard Graduate School of Arts and Sciences alumni
Harvard Graduate School of Education faculty
Jewish American social scientists
People from Lexington, Massachusetts
Scientists from Philadelphia
University of Pennsylvania alumni
Carol
Women linguists
Writers from Philadelphia
American women non-fiction writers
20th-century linguists
21st-century American women